"The Adventure of the Norwood Builder", one of the 56 short Sherlock Holmes stories written by Sir Arthur Conan Doyle, is the second tale from The Return of Sherlock Holmes. The story was first published in Collier's (US) on 31 October 1903 and in The Strand Magazine (UK) in November 1903.

Plot
Sherlock Holmes and Dr. Watson are visited by "the unhappy John Hector McFarlane," a young lawyer from Blackheath who has been accused of murdering one of his clients, builder Jonas Oldacre. McFarlane explains to Holmes that Oldacre had come to his office only a day earlier and asked him to draw up his will in legal language. To his surprise, McFarlane saw that Oldacre was making him the sole beneficiary and even heir to a considerable bequest, and McFarlane cannot imagine why he would do so. That business took McFarlane to Oldacre's house in Lower Norwood, where some documents had to be examined for legal purposes and where the murder allegedly took place. McFarlane left quite late and stayed at a local inn. He claims to have read about the murder in the newspaper the next morning on the train. The paper said quite clearly that the police were looking for him.

The evidence against the young McFarlane is quite damning. His stick has been found in Oldacre's room, and a fire was extinguished just outside in which a pile of dry timber burnt to ashes, complete with the smell of burnt flesh. It seems more than likely that McFarlane did the crime, especially as it is known that he was there around that time. Inspector Lestrade gloats in the apparent knowledge that he, unlike Holmes, is on the right track. Holmes begins his own investigation into the matter by going to Blackheath. This puzzles Lestrade, who had expected him to go first to Norwood. McFarlane's mother, Holmes finds out, was once engaged to Oldacre years earlier but later wanted nothing to do with the man once she found out how cruel he was: he had let a cat loose in a bird sanctuary.

Upon examining the handwritten notes given to McFarlane by Oldacre to be rendered into legally acceptable language, Holmes reckons they were written in a very haphazard fashion as if the writer failed to care about what he was writing. The alternation between legible handwriting and incomprehensible squiggles suggests to Holmes that the "will" was written hurriedly on a train, with the legible writing representing stops at stations. Also, Oldacre's financial dealings are found to have been a bit odd. Several cheques for substantial amounts, for unknown reasons, have recently been made out to a Mr. Cornelius. The discovery of Oldacre's trouser buttons in the fire ashes does nothing to exonerate McFarlane. Holmes fears the worst; "All my instincts are in one direction, and all the facts are in another." Still, Holmes has powers of observation that suggest Oldacre's housekeeper is deliberately withholding information.

Lestrade's gloating reaches a peak when a bloody thumbprint is found at Oldacre's house that matches McFarlane's thumb. However, Holmes becomes quite sure that something very devious is afoot, as he had examined that part of the house only a day earlier, and the thumbprint was quite surely not there then. Because McFarlane has been in gaol since his arrest at 221B Baker Street, Holmes deduces that someone is attempting a deception. Holmes sets up a small fire in one room of the house with a little straw and tells three of Lestrade's constables to shout "Fire!" Lestrade and Watson are quite astonished at what happens next: Oldacre emerges alive from a hidden chamber at the end of a hallway, where Holmes has deduced it must be by measuring the corridors, and runs to escape the fire. Oldacre is immediately seized.

It is revealed that McFarlane being accused of his murder had been part of a revenge campaign against the woman who rejected Oldacre years previously, the young mother of McFarlane. Oldacre tries to pass off his actions as a practical joke but is taken into custody, along with the housekeeper as an accomplice. Holmes lightly chaffs his rival for neglecting Blackheath, where he acquired the key information. As for Mr. Cornelius, the recipient of so much of Oldacre's munificence, Holmes deduces that it had likely been an alias used by Oldacre, who has been leading a double life with the eventual goal of shedding his Oldacre identity so that he would be able to start a new life. The bank account of "Mr. Cornelius" will be seized by Oldacre's creditors. Oldacre swears revenge against Holmes, who serenely dismisses the threats. Holmes remarks to Lestrade that Oldacre's plot was nearly perfect. Still, he went one step too far by planting the thumbprint (from a wax seal that McFarlane had pressed), thinking it would create even more damning evidence, after Holmes had already examined the room where it was found. "He wished to improve what was already perfect", says Holmes, "and so he ruined everything."

Background
Conan Doyle lived in South Norwood from 1891 to 1894, and so was very familiar with the area. There is however a good deal of ambiguity as to specific settings within the story. The Norwood where Oldacre lives for instance is called "Lower Norwood", which until around 1885 would have been the term used for what is now West Norwood. The story however was penned some time after this date, and Oldacre is described as living in "Deep Dene House, at the Sydenham end of the road of that name". South Norwood itself might be a logical candidate for Lower Norwood, however the only discernible connection between the story and South Norwood is that Norwood Junction railway station is used by Oldacre. McFarlane spends the night in The Anerley Arms, a pub that still exists and which has a derelict upper floor (no more overnight guests). It is now one of the Samuel Smith's family of pubs and celebrates its connection with Sherlock Holmes.

This is one of the few Holmes stories in which a fingerprint provides a good clue to the nature of the problem. The wax thumbprint reproduction idea was devised by, and bought from, Bertram Fletcher Robinson (1870–1907), who also helped plot The Hound of the Baskervilles (1901).

At the start of the story, Watson mentions two unrecorded cases that Holmes investigated around the same time as this story:
 "The case of the papers of Ex-President Murillo", which Doyle later wrote as "The Adventure of Wisteria Lodge".
 "The shocking affair of the Dutch steamship Friesland", which loosely inspired a 1944 episode of the radio series The New Adventures of Sherlock Holmes and the 1945 film Pursuit to Algiers, both starring Basil Rathbone as Holmes.
 A reference to Professor Moriarty prefaces the story. "'From the point of view of the criminal expert', said Mr Sherlock Holmes, 'London has become a singularly uninteresting city since the death of the late lamented Moriarty'". Moriarty is mentioned in two other 1903 stories: 'The Adventure of the Missing Three-Quarter' and 'The Adventure of the Empty House'.

Publication history
"The Adventure of the Norwood Builder" was first published in the US in Collier's on 31 October 1903, and in the UK in The Strand Magazine in November 1903. The story was published with seven illustrations by Frederic Dorr Steele in Collier's, and with seven illustrations by Sidney Paget in the Strand. It was included in the short story collection The Return of Sherlock Holmes, which was published in the US in February 1905 and in the UK in March 1905.

Adaptations

Film and television
The story was adapted as a short silent film released in 1922 as part of the Stoll film series starring Eille Norwood as Sherlock Holmes and Hubert Willis as Dr. Watson, with Cyril Raymond as John McFarlane and Teddy Arundell as Inspector Hopkins.

The Granada Sherlock Holmes television series with Jeremy Brett was faithful to the original story with a few exceptions. In the adaptation, Oldacre kills and burns a tramp, but in the book, he refuses to admit what flesh was burned. Mrs. McFarlane is a recent widow instead of her husband being alive but away. Watson instead of Holmes traces payments to Cornelius, and finally, Holmes instead of Lestrade, warns McFarlane that his words may be used against him.

In the first episode of season two of Elementary, Holmes mentions the Norwood Builder as a case he and Lestrade worked on in London.

Radio and audio dramas
A radio adaptation aired as an episode of the American radio series The Adventures of Sherlock Holmes. The episode was adapted by Edith Meiser and aired on 13 April 1931, with Richard Gordon as Sherlock Holmes and Leigh Lovell as Dr. Watson.

Meiser also adapted the story as an episode of the American radio series The New Adventures of Sherlock Holmes, with Basil Rathbone as Holmes and Nigel Bruce as Watson, that aired on 17 November 1940.

Felix Felton adapted the story for the BBC Home Service as part of the 1952–1969 radio series starring Carleton Hobbs as Holmes and Norman Shelley as Watson, with Felton as Inspector Lestrade and John Turnbull as Jonas Oldacre. The adaptation aired on 7 October 1954.

The story was adapted as an episode titled "The Tale of the Norwood Builder" in a series of radio adaptations starring John Gielgud as Holmes and Ralph Richardson as Watson. The episode aired on the BBC Light Programme on 23 November 1954 and NBC radio on 20 February 1955.

An audio drama based on the story was released in 1971 on one side of an LP record, as one of several recordings starring Robert Hardy as Holmes and Nigel Stock as Watson. It was dramatised and produced by Michael Hardwick and Mollie Hardwick.

"The Norwood Builder" was dramatised for BBC Radio 4 in 1993 by Bert Coules, as part of the 1989–1998 radio series starring Clive Merrison as Holmes and Michael Williams as Watson. It featured Peter Sallis as Jonas Oldacre, Donald Gee as Inspector Lestrade, and David Holt as John McFarlane. In it, because of his change of attitude towards fame (acquired while traveling in Tibet during his "death"), Holmes, at the beginning, informs Watson that "there must be no more stories" but that Watson should continue to keep notes on their cases to stockpile them for possible future publication. Also, after his capture, Oldacre reveals that he also believed Holmes to be dead.

The story was adapted as a 2007 episode of The Classic Adventures of Sherlock Holmes, a series on the American radio show Imagination Theatre, starring John Patrick Lowrie as Holmes and Lawrence Albert as Watson, with Rick May as Lestrade.

Other media
The Wishbone Mysteries novel Forgotten Heroes (1998) references "The Adventure of the Norwood Builder".

References
Notes

Sources

External links

 , 21 years before the setting of this story. Conan Doyle's house is roughly on the H of the big "SOUTH NORWOOD WARD".
 Map of London sites mentioned in "The Norwood Builder" by Ross E. Davies & Cattleya M. Concepcion

Norwood Builder, The Adventure of the
London literature
1903 short stories
Works originally published in Collier's